Trouy is a commune in the Cher department in the Centre-Val de Loire region of France.

Geography
The A71 autoroute passes through the commune along with the N144 and N142 roads.

Population

Sights
 The church of St. Pierre, dating from the twelfth century.

See also
Communes of the Cher department

References

External links

Official Trouy website 
Départemental Tourisme Office 

Communes of Cher (department)